The 2001 Liège–Bastogne–Liège was the 87th edition of the Liège–Bastogne–Liège cycle race and was held on 22 April 2001. The race started in Liège and finished in Ans. The race was won by Oscar Camenzind of the Lampre team.

General classification

References

2001
2001 in Belgian sport
Liege-Bastogne-Liege
April 2001 sports events in Europe